Mark Briggs (6 April 1884 – 15 March 1965) was a New Zealand labourer, auctioneer, pacifist, socialist and politician. He was born in Londesborough, Yorkshire, England, on 6 April 1884.

In World War I, he was one of the group of 14 New Zealand conscientious objectors, notably including Archibald Baxter, forcibly enlisted, sent to the front in France, and maltreated.

He was a member of the Legislative Council from 9 March 1936 to 8 March 1950.

References

1884 births
1965 deaths
People from Londesborough
English emigrants to New Zealand
New Zealand socialists
New Zealand Labour Party MLCs
New Zealand pacifists
New Zealand conscientious objectors
New Zealand communists
Members of the New Zealand Legislative Council
New Zealand people of World War I